Misfits 2 is the third studio album from Christian hip hop duo Social Club, and it was self-released on April 29, 2014.

Critical reception

At New Release Tuesday, Mark Ryan rated the album a perfect five stars, stating that "This album is perplexing, there will be people that love it and people that don't care for it." In addition, Ryan wrote that "At first listen Misfits 2 is light and flaky like a Tenderflake pie crust... but upon listening closer it is deep and rich like a chocolate bobka."

Chart performance
For the Billboard charting week of May 17, 2014, Misfits 2 ranked No. 59 on the Billboard 200 albums chart, and it reached Nos. 6 and 3 on the Christian Albums and Gospel Albums charts, respectively. It also was the No. 10 on the Rap Albums chart that same week and No. 14 on the Independent Albums chart.  The album has 10,000 copies in the US as of March 2015.

Track listing

Chart performance

References

2014 albums
Social Club Misfits albums
Sequel albums
Albums produced by Gawvi